The 1969 Nobel Peace Prize was awarded to the United Nations agency International Labour Organization (founded in 1919) "for creating international legislation insuring certain norms for working conditions in every country." The agency became the ninth organization awarded with a Nobel Prize.

Laureate

Formed in 1919 under the League of Nations and right after the Treaty of Versailles, the International Labour Organization is the first and oldest specialised agency of the United Nations. It was established with main object of the establishing principles to improve the working conditions and social rights of employees. In 1969, the organization adopted 128 conventions drawn up by representatives of national authorities, employers and employees from its member countries. While a major contributor to international labour law, they also protect freedom of association and the effective recognition of the right to collective bargaining, the elimination of forced or compulsory labour, the abolition of child labour, and the elimination of discrimination in respect of employment and occupation. The Norwegian Nobel Committee believed that such reforms strengthen the cause of peace and reduce social injustice.

Deliberations

Nominations
The International Labour Organization (ILO) first received a singular nomination in 1949. In 1969, the said group earned thirteen nominations – the most nominated – which led to it being awarded the peace prize.

In 1969, the Norwegian Nobel Committee received 75 nominations for 35 individuals and 10 organizations such as Ernst Bloch, John Collins, Danilo Dolci, Cyrus S. Eaton, the Universal Esperanto Association (UEA), the Pugwash Conferences (awarded in 1995) and the Islands of Peace. Eighteen of the nominees were newly recommended such as Giorgio La Pira, John D. Rockefeller III, Alexander Dubček, Noam Chomsky, Athenagoras I of Constantinople, Jayaprakash Narayan and the people of Czechoslovakia. The Japanese educator Kaoru Hatoyama was the only female nominee while the Indian author Jogesh Chandra Bhattacharya, who died in 1960, was posthumously nominated. Notable figures like Josef Beran, Heloise Brainerd, Fred Hampton, Emrys Hughes, Zakir Husain, C. W. W. Kannangara and Jeff Sharlet died in 1969 without having been nominated for the peace prize.

Norwegian Nobel Committee
The following members of the Norwegian Nobel Committee appointed by the Storting were responsible for the selection of the 1969 Nobel laureate in accordance with the will of Alfred Nobel:

References

External links

1969
International Labour Organization